Linq or LINQ may refer to:

 Linq (card game)
 LinQ, a Japanese girl pop music group
 Language Integrated Query, programming language technology
 The Linq, a hotel and casino in Las Vegas, United States
 Linqing, a city in China